Khoshk Rud (also Romanized as Khoshk Rūd; also known as Khoshkeh Rūd) is a village in Hanza Rural District, Hanza District, Rabor County, Kerman Province, Iran. At the 2006 census, its population was 388, in 86 families.

References 

Populated places in Rabor County